Sachhidanand Narayan Deb (15 October 1923 – 27 December 2019) was an Indian politician from Odisha belonging to Indian National Congress. He was a legislator of the Odisha Legislative Assembly.

Biography
Deb was elected as a legislator of the Odisha Legislative Assembly from Chikiti in 1971. He was also elected from this constituency in 1974. He is the father-in-law of Usha Devi who is the current legislator of this constituency.

Deb died on 27 December 2019 at the age of 96.

References

2019 deaths
Indian National Congress politicians from Odisha
Members of the Odisha Legislative Assembly
1920s births
People from Ganjam district